Oenocarpus bataua, the patawa, sehe, hungurahua (Ecuador) or mingucha, is a palm tree native to the Amazon rainforest. The tree produces edible fruits rich in high-quality oil.

Distribution and habitat
Its distribution stretches from Panamá and Trinidad to the Amazon basin (Colombia, Venezuela, Guianas, Brazil, Bolivia, Ecuador, Peru). Two varieties are recognized:

Oenocarpus bataua var. bataua - Panama and South America
Oenocarpus bataua var. oligocarpus (Griseb. & H.Wendl.) A.J.Hend. - Trinidad, Venezuela, Guianas

In Western Amazonia O. bataua is one of the top three palm species in both frequency and abundance. It reaches its highest densities in soils of low to intermediate nutrient concentration. In Colombia, it is usually found in sandy soils with a high organic matter content that are subject to flooding, possibly because there are few other species which compete with it.  It can grow extremely well on unflooded soils as witnessed by high-density stands in the pastures of the Colombian Chocó, though it is rarely found on terra firma in the wild since competition from other species is such that it rarely gets the high light levels it needs to set fruit.

Description
Its stem is solitary, erect,  in height and  diameter, smooth, and ring-shaped.

Uses
Patawa fruits are used for cosmetic, food, and pharmaceutical purposes.

Traditionally indigenous peoples have collected the fruit and matured it in tepid water in order to prepare drinks and also to extract its oil. Its drupes are 8–10% oil. The fresh meolo is edible too. 
The rachis have been used to manufacture arrows and the leaves to make baskets and construct provisional housings.
Additionally, Rhynchophorus palmarum larvae are harvested from the palm.

Oil
Traditionally, patauá oil is used by Amazonian communities in fried foods. In Bolivia, the oil is known as aceite de majo.

It is also used in cosmetic production, as it can be used as a tonic to soften the hair.

The oil is used in traditional medicine to treat cough and bronchitis.

References

External links
 

bataua
Flora of Panama
Flora of South America
Flora of Trinidad and Tobago
Medicinal plants
Plants described in 1823
Trees of Peru
Edible palms
Flora without expected TNC conservation status